Zaakir, born Courtenay Henderson and better known as Soup, is an American rapper and a founding member of the group Jurassic 5.

Personal Life 
Zaakir grew up in South Central, Los Angeles, and he had a music-loving father who helped him to discover funk music, including the Ohio Players and the Fatback Band, Otis Redding, Muddy Waters, and Sam Cooke. He also grew up singing Al Green and Fats Domino. He eventually learned about hip hop, including Sugarhill Gang. He attended Manual Arts High. His uncle, who was working for a Gang Taskforce invited him to a Rap for Peace show, where he performed 'Stop Gang Violence''', and that helped get the ball rolling in his rap career. He is a fan of 80s horror movies.

 Music Career 

 The Rebels of Rhythm 
Together, with Akil (of Jurassic 5), and Shawny Mac [aka Afrika], he was a member of The Rebels of Rhythm, who met in high school. His initial interest was in singing, and Akil heard him freestyling, and encouraged him to rap more.

 Jurassic 5 
Zaakir found fame as part of the hip-hop group Jurassic 5. He was an instrumental figure at Immortal Records, Interscope, and Loud Records, where he orchestrated a record deal for hip-hop group Mobb Deep. He has received gold records for his work on the Wu-Tang Clan’s debut album, Enter the Wu-Tang (36 Chambers), and Mobb Deep’s sophomore album, The Infamous. Zaakir was also responsible for Jurassic 5’s first demo deal with Relativity Records. Jurassic 5 were part of the 2000 and 2001 Warped Tours. On the 2000 tour, someone threw something at Soup, and he moved to the front of the stage and asked then challenged: "Who threw this? Now nobody wants to say anything? After every show, we go back to our merch booth and sign shirts/albums, come see me there and let me know who you are". Playing the Warped Tour, and playing through those challenges helped J5 build an excellent live show reputation.

Jurassic 5 were known for their rapping, and their harmonizing, melodies, and hooks including the influence of groups, including the Cold Crush Brothers, and in his 2022 appearance on Talib Kweli's People's Party podcast, Nu-Mark credit's Soup's infectious hooks and Zaakir for being the heart of Jurassic 5's harmonization.

 Portable Payback 
Soup and Marc 7 combined to create a new group called Portable Payback, and they released their debut single Relax in 2008. They released an EP, Relax on October 27, 2009.

 Fullee Love 
Soup released his solo debut EP as Fulleee Lova, called Still In Fullee Love, produced by Nicholas “Nick Green” Eaholtz, on the  Nalja Music label in February 2017.

OC Weekly commented on Still In Fullee Love as follows:

Most of the songs featured on Still In Fullee Love were created when Jurassic 5 returned from a 7-year hiatus to play Coachella in 2013. During that hiatus, Zaakir worked in retail.

In late 2013, Zaakir performed in London, Barcelona, and Portugal.
 Guest Appearances 
On April 19, 2005, DJ Z-Trip released the single Listen to the DJ, which featured Soup.

In 2005, Soup was featured on Family Rap by Breakestra off their Hit the Floor album.

He was featured on Right About Now from Marc 7's 2015 solo album Food, Clothing and Shelter.

 Film 
His voiceover and on-screen roles include Jurassic 5's music video for their song The Influence, Nickelodeon’s All That, Blast (with Eddie Griffin), and FOX’s Fastlane'', starring Bill Bellamy.

References

Year of birth missing (living people)
Living people
American hip hop musicians
Jurassic 5 members
Place of birth missing (living people)